A permutation test (also called re-randomization test) is an exact statistical hypothesis test making use of the proof by contradiction.
A permutation test involves two or more samples. The null hypothesis is that all samples come from the same distribution . Under the null hypothesis, the distribution of the test statistic is obtained by calculating all possible values of the test statistic under possible rearrangements of the observed data. Permutation tests are, therefore, a form of resampling.

Permutation tests can be understood as surrogate data testing where the surrogate data under the null hypothesis are obtained through permutations of the original data.

In other words, the method by which treatments are allocated to subjects in an experimental design is mirrored in the analysis of that design. If the labels are exchangeable under the null hypothesis, then the resulting tests yield exact significance levels; see also exchangeability. Confidence intervals can then be derived from the tests. The theory has evolved from the works of Ronald Fisher and E. J. G. Pitman in the 1930s.

Permutation tests should not be confused with randomized tests.

Method 

Let  and  be the sample size collected from each group.

The test proceeds as follows. First, the difference in means between the two samples is calculated: this is the observed value of the test statistic, .

The set of these calculated differences is the exact distribution of possible differences (for this sample) under the null hypothesis that group labels are exchangeable (i.e., are randomly assigned).

Many implementations of permutation tests require that the observed data itself be counted as one of the permutations so that the permutation p-value will never be zero.

Alternatively, if the only purpose of the test is to reject or not reject the null hypothesis, one could sort the recorded differences, and then observe if  is contained within the middle % of them, for some significance level . If it is not, we reject the hypothesis of identical probability curves at the  significance level.

For paired samples the paired permutation test needs to be applied.

Relation to parametric tests

Permutation tests are a subset of non-parametric statistics. Assuming that our experimental data come from data measured from two treatment groups, the method simply generates the distribution of mean differences under the assumption that the two groups are not distinct in terms of the measured variable. From this, one then uses the observed statistic ( above) to see to what extent this statistic is special, i.e., the likelihood of observing the magnitude of such a value (or larger) if the treatment labels had simply been randomized after treatment.

In contrast to permutation tests, the distributions underlying many popular "classical" statistical tests, such as the t-test, F-test, z-test, and χ2 test, are obtained from theoretical probability distributions. Fisher's exact test is an example of a commonly used permutation test for evaluating the association between two dichotomous variables. When sample sizes are very large, the Pearson's chi-square test will give accurate results. For small samples, the chi-square reference distribution cannot be assumed to give a correct description of the probability distribution of the test statistic, and in this situation the use of Fisher's exact test becomes more appropriate.

Permutation tests exist in many situations where parametric tests do not (e.g., when deriving an optimal test when losses are proportional to the size of an error rather than its square).  All simple and many relatively complex parametric tests have a corresponding permutation test version that is defined by using the same test statistic as the parametric test, but obtains the p-value from the sample-specific permutation distribution of that statistic, rather than from the theoretical distribution derived from the parametric assumption.  For example, it is possible in this manner to construct a permutation t-test, a permutation χ2 test of association, a permutation version of Aly's test for comparing variances and so on.

The major drawbacks to permutation tests are that they
 Can be computationally intensive and may require "custom" code for difficult-to-calculate statistics. This must be rewritten for every case.
 Are primarily used to provide a p-value. The inversion of the test to get confidence regions/intervals requires even more computation.

Advantages
Permutation tests exist for any test statistic, regardless of whether or not its distribution is known. Thus one is always free to choose the statistic which best discriminates between hypothesis and alternative and which minimizes losses.

Permutation tests can be used for analyzing unbalanced designs and for combining dependent tests on mixtures of categorical, ordinal, and metric data (Pesarin, 2001) . They can also be used to analyze qualitative data that has been quantitized (i.e., turned into numbers). Permutation tests may be ideal for analyzing quantitized data that do not satisfy statistical assumptions underlying traditional parametric tests (e.g., t-tests, ANOVA), see PERMANOVA.

Before the 1980s, the burden of creating the reference distribution was overwhelming except for data sets with small sample sizes.

Since the 1980s, the confluence of relatively inexpensive fast computers and the development of new sophisticated path algorithms applicable in special situations made the application of permutation test methods practical for a wide range of problems. It also initiated the addition of exact-test options in the main statistical software packages and the appearance of specialized software for performing a wide range of uni- and multi-variable exact tests and computing test-based "exact" confidence intervals.

Limitations
An important assumption behind a permutation test is that the observations are exchangeable under the null hypothesis.  An important consequence of this assumption is that tests of difference in location (like a permutation t-test) require equal variance under the normality assumption. In this respect, the permutation t-test shares the same weakness as the classical Student's t-test (the Behrens–Fisher problem). A third alternative in this situation is to use a bootstrap-based test. Good (2005)  explains the difference between permutation tests and bootstrap tests the following way: "Permutations test hypotheses concerning distributions; bootstraps test hypotheses concerning parameters. As a result, the bootstrap entails less-stringent assumptions."  Bootstrap tests are not exact. In some cases, a permutation test based on a properly studentized statistic can be asymptotically exact even when the exchangeability assumption is violated.
Bootstrap-based tests can test with the null hypothesis  and, therefore, are suited for performing equivalence testing.

Monte Carlo testing
An asymptotically equivalent permutation test can be created when there are too many possible orderings of the data to allow complete enumeration in a convenient manner. This is done by generating the reference distribution by Monte Carlo sampling, which takes a small (relative to the total number of permutations) random sample of the possible replicates.
The realization that this could be applied to any permutation test on any dataset was an important breakthrough in the area of applied statistics.  The earliest known references to this approach are Eden and Yates (1933) and Dwass (1957).
This type of permutation test is known under various names: approximate permutation test, Monte Carlo permutation tests or random permutation tests.

After  random permutations, it is possible to obtain a confidence interval for the p-value based on the Binomial distribution, see Binomial proportion confidence interval.

On the other hand, the purpose of estimating the p-value is most often to decide whether , where  is the threshold at which the null hypothesis will be rejected (typically ). In the example above, the confidence interval only tells us that there is roughly a 50% chance that the p-value is smaller than 0.05, i.e. it is completely unclear whether the null hypothesis should be rejected at a level .

If it is only important to know whether  for a given , it is logical to continue simulating until the statement  can be established to be true or false with a very low probability of error. ( will typically be chosen to be extremely small, e.g. 1/1000.) Stopping rules to achieve this have been developed  which can be incorporated with minimal additional computational cost. In fact, depending on the true underlying p-value it will often be found that the number of simulations required is remarkably small (e.g. as low as 5 and often not larger than 100) before a decision can be reached with virtual certainty.

Example tests 
 Permutational analysis of variance

Literature 
Original references:
 Fisher, R.A. (1935) The Design of Experiments, New York: Hafner
 Pitman, E. J. G. (1937) "Significance tests which may be applied to samples from any population", Royal Statistical Society Supplement, 4: 119-130 and 225-32 (parts I and II).  
 
Modern references:
 
Edgington, E. S., & Onghena, P. (2007) Randomization tests, 4th ed. New York: Chapman and Hall/CRC 
 Good, Phillip I. (2005) Permutation, Parametric and Bootstrap Tests of Hypotheses, 3rd ed., Springer 
 
 Lunneborg, Cliff. (1999) Data Analysis by Resampling, Duxbury Press. .
 Pesarin, F. (2001). Multivariate Permutation Tests : With Applications in Biostatistics, John Wiley & Sons. 
 
Computational methods:

Current research on permutation tests
 Good, P.I. (2012) Practitioner's Guide to Resampling Methods. 
 Good, P.I. (2005) Permutation, Parametric, and Bootstrap Tests of Hypotheses
 Hesterberg, T. C., D. S. Moore, S. Monaghan, A. Clipson, and R. Epstein (2005):  Bootstrap Methods and Permutation Tests, software.
 Moore, D. S., G. McCabe, W. Duckworth, and S. Sclove (2003): Bootstrap Methods and Permutation Tests
 Simon, J. L. (1997): Resampling: The New Statistics.
 Yu, Chong Ho (2003): Resampling methods: concepts, applications, and justification. Practical Assessment, Research & Evaluation, 8(19). (statistical bootstrapping)
 Resampling: A Marriage of Computers and Statistics (ERIC Digests)

References 

Statistical tests
Nonparametric statistics